F.H. Medical College and Hospital, Agra, established in 2014, is a full-fledged tertiary private Medical college and hospital. It is located at Agra in Uttar Pradesh. The college imparts the degree of Bachelor of Medicine and Surgery (MBBS). The yearly undergraduate student intake is 150.

Courses
F.H. Medical College and Hospital, Agra undertakes the education and training of 150 students in MBBS courses.

Affiliated
The college is affiliated with Atal Bihari Vajpayee Medical University and is recognized by the National Medical Commission.

References

Medical colleges in Uttar Pradesh
Educational institutions established in 2014
2014 establishments in Uttar Pradesh